Jamison Run is a small tributary of Slippery Rock Creek in western Pennsylvania.  The stream rises in northern Lawrence County  and flows south entering Slippery Rock Creek at Elliotts Mills, Pennsylvania. The watershed is roughly 46% agricultural, 45% forested and the rest is other uses.

References

Rivers of Pennsylvania
Tributaries of the Beaver River
Rivers of Lawrence County, Pennsylvania